Vyacheslav Tineyev (1 May 1933 – 20 May 2013) was a Soviet sailor. He competed in the Tornado event at the 1976 Summer Olympics.

References

External links
 

1933 births
2013 deaths
Soviet male sailors (sport)
Olympic sailors of the Soviet Union
Sailors at the 1976 Summer Olympics – Tornado
Sportspeople from Kaluga